Jordan Raycroft is the self-titled debut album from Canadian musician Jordan Raycroft. It was nominated for a Juno Award in 2014. In 2013 it received two GMA Canada Covenant Awards nominations for Folk/Roots Album of the Year and CD Artwork Design of the Year.

Track listing

References

2013 debut albums
Jordan Raycroft albums